Muriel Sharp (born 2 May 1953) is a British former cyclist. She competed in the women's road race event at the 1984 Summer Olympics.

References

External links
 

1953 births
Living people
British female cyclists
Olympic cyclists of Great Britain
Cyclists at the 1984 Summer Olympics
Cyclists from Greater London